Pool is a Malaysian-Canadian short film, directed by Chris Chong Chan Fui and released in 2007. The film depicts a group of children playing in a swimming pool in Aceh, Indonesia, working through their fear of water following the 2004 Indian Ocean earthquake and tsunami.

The film premiered in the Wavelengths program at the 2007 Toronto International Film Festival, where it won the award for Best Canadian Short Film. It was later named to TIFF's annual year-end Canada's Top Ten list of the year's best Canadian short films.

References

External links
 

2007 films
Canadian short documentary films
Malaysian short films
Films shot in Indonesia
2000s Canadian films
2007 short documentary films
Malaysian documentary films